Fabre is a provincial electoral district in Quebec, Canada, that elects members to the National Assembly of Quebec. The district is located in Laval and includes the westernmost portion of Île Jésus (or Île de Laval) west of Autoroute 15 in the northern half of the district and west of Autoroute 13 in the southern half.

It was created for the 1966 election from a part of Laval electoral district electoral district.

In the change from the 2001 to the 2011 electoral map, it lost part of its territory to the newly created Sainte-Rose electoral district, but gained some territory from Chomedey.

In the change from the 2011 to 2017 electoral map, it will gain some more territory from Chomedey, in the area around Parc Le Boutillier.

The district is named after Édouard-Charles Fabre who was the third archbishop of the Roman Catholic Archdiocese of Montreal from 1876 to 1896.

Members of the Legislative Assembly / National Assembly

Election results

|}

|}

^ Change is from redistributed results. CAQ change is from ADQ.

|-
 
|Liberal
|Michelle Courchesne
|align="right"|15,349
|align="right"|45.50
|align="right"|

|-

|-
|}

References

External links
Information
 Elections Quebec

Election results
 Election results (National Assembly)

Maps
 2011 map (PDF)
 2001 map (Flash)
2001–2011 changes (Flash)
1992–2001 changes (Flash)
 Electoral map of Laval region
 Quebec electoral map, 2011

Politics of Laval, Quebec
Quebec provincial electoral districts